The Nehru Cup was an international association football tournament organised by the All India Football Federation (AIFF), named after the first Prime Minister of India, Jawaharlal Nehru. It was launched in 1982, but was not held from 1998 to 2006. After the trophy was won by Iraq in 1997, it was reinstated only in 2007 before officially being held last in 2012 and was replaced in 2017.

History

Overview (1982–2012)

Nehru Cup was launched in 1982 by the All India Football Federation (AIFF) in memory of India's first Prime Minister Jawaharlal Nehru. Known as "ONGC (Oil and Natural Gas Corporation) Nehru Cup" for sponsorship reasons, it was held once every 2 years. The first edition was inaugurated by Nehru's daughter, Prime Minister Indira Gandhi and Uruguay lifted the trophy with a 2–0 win against China. It was not held from 1998 to 2007.

The tournament was mainly started to popularise football in India, and the hosts won for the first time in 2007 beating Syria.

North Korea became the first Asian team to win the trophy in 1993 edition, defeating Romania B 2–0.

Nehru Club Cup (1990) 
In 1990, the "Jawaharlal Nehru Centenary Club Cup" (to celebrate the birth centenary of Nehru) was organized in Kolkata as an international club tournament in the place of 1990 edition of Nehru Cup, which became the only international club tournament held in the country. The tournament was won by Paraguayan side Club Olimpia after their 1–0 win against Argentine club Club de Gimnasia y Esgrima La Plata, in which Luis Monzón scored the winner.

Mohammedan Sporting Club was the only Indian team to qualify for semi-finals. They defeated Zambia national team 1–0 and FC Metalist 1925 Kharkiv 1–0, before losing 2–0 to Argentine side Gimnasia Esgrima. In the semi-final, Mohammedan lost 1–0 to the eventual champions, Paraguayan outfit Club Olimpia.

Official awards:
Taj Bengal Trophy for player of the tournament: Emeka Ezeugo
Director's Special Trophy for top scorer: Gabriel González

TV coverage
The first Nehru Cup in 1982 was covered by Prabir Roy with a 5 on-line camera operation. This was long before Doordarshan started the same during the Delhi Asian Games in November 1982. This was apparently the first Color T.V. broadcast in India.

Absence, revival and replacement
The tournament was shelved after 1997 due to lack of sponsorship and other reasons. It was revived in 2007 mainly due to persuasion by the former coach of India national football team – Bob Houghton. The original rolling trophy could not be recovered from Iraq, and a new trophy was designed.

The tournament held during 2007 was called the ONGC Nehru Cup, to acknowledge sponsorship from the Oil and Natural Gas Corporation. The 2007 Nehru Cup took place from 17 to 29 August 2007 with Syria, Kyrgyzstan, India, Cambodia and Bangladesh as participating nations where India won their first title after hosting it for the last couple of decades defeating the much higher ranked 
Syria in the final by a 1-0 margin, on a goal scored by N. P. Pradeep in the 44th minute on a back pass from Bhaichung Bhutia.

The 2009 Nehru Cup took place in New Delhi from 19 to 31 August 2009. After the participation of Palestine was cancelled by the AIFF, the tournament was changed into a round-robin format with five teams playing each other and the top two clashing in the final. India defeated Syria by 5–4 on penalties after a 1–1 draw in the final on 31 August 2009.

The 2012 Nehru Cup was the 15th edition of the Nehru Cup and 3rd Nehru Cup since it was revived in 2007. It was held from 22 August to 2 September. The tournament was hosted in New Delhi, India. A total of 5 teams participated in the tournament through being invited by the All India Football Federation. The final match happened between India and Cameroon and India won the match in penalty shoot out 5-4 after the match ended 2-2 after 120 minutes of play.

Hopes to have another tournament in 2014 were shelved in August 2014 due to the AIFF not being able to pursue capital investment.

AIFF revealed on 17 May 2016 that it plans to replace Nehru Cup with a new Intercontinental Cup.

Results

Notes

Medal summary

See also
 Nehru Cup (cricket)
 2017 Hero Tri-Nation Series
 Intercontinental Cup (India)
 List of association football competitions

References

Further reading

External links

 IndianFootball.de - India's premier football site (archived)
 Soccertub - All coverage for 2012 Nehru Cup
 Nehru Cup on the RSSSF
 ONGC NEHRU TROPHY 2007 on Kolkata Football (archived)
 ONGC Nehru Cup (2009) Photo Gallery
 2012 edition results on Nehru Cup blogsite

 
International association football competitions hosted by India
Sport in India
Football in India
International men's association football invitational tournaments
1982 establishments in India
2012 disestablishments in India